This is a list of the Australian species of the family Batrachedridae. It also acts as an index to the species articles and forms part of the full List of moths of Australia.

Batrachedra arenosella (Walker, 1864)
Batrachedra astathma Meyrick, 1897
Batrachedra capnospila Lower, 1899
Batrachedra diplosema Meyrick, 1897
Batrachedra ditrota Meyrick, 1897
Batrachedra epixantha Meyrick, 1897
Batrachedra eremochtha Meyrick, 1897
Batrachedra eurema Bradley, 1956
Batrachedra eustola Meyrick, 1897
Batrachedra helarcha Meyrick, 1897
Batrachedra holochlora Meyrick, 1897
Batrachedra hypachroa Meyrick, 1897
Batrachedra hypoxutha Meyrick, 1897
Batrachedra leucophyta Meyrick, 1897
Batrachedra liopis Meyrick, 1897
Batrachedra lygropis Herrich-Schäffer, 1853
Batrachedra megalodoxa Meyrick, 1897
Batrachedra metaxias Meyrick, 1897
Batrachedra microdryas Turner, 1923
Batrachedra microtoma Meyrick, 1897
Batrachedra mylephata Meyrick, 1897
Batrachedra notocapna Turner, 1939
Batrachedra phorcydia Meyrick, 1897
Batrachedra plagiocentra Meyrick, 1897
Batrachedra salina Meyrick, 1921
Batrachedra satirica Meyrick, 1917
Batrachedra silignea Turner, 1923
Batrachedra sterilis Meyrick, 1897
Batrachedra trimeris Meyrick, 1897
Batrachedra velox Meyrick, 1897
Batrachedra volucris Meyrick, 1897
Batrachedra zonochra Lower, 1904

External links 
Batrachedridae at Australian Faunal Directory

Australia